The Supermarine Nanok was a British three-engined biplane flying boat built by Supermarine. Built to meet a Royal Danish Navy requirement, the single prototype was rebuilt as a private air yacht and renamed the Supermarine Solent.

Development and design
The Nanok (Inuit language: "Polar bear") was a three-engined development of Supermarine's successful Southampton flying boat, designed to meet a Danish requirement for a torpedo-carrying flying boat. A prototype was ordered on 17 June 1926, and the aircraft first flew on 21 June 1927. Testing was disappointing, and despite modifications the aircraft could not meet the specified performance and was rejected by the Danes.

In 1928 the aircraft was renamed the Supermarine Solent, and offered for sale as a torpedo bomber, but failed to sell. It was therefore converted to a civilian 9 seater air yacht for the brewing magnate Ernest Guinness. This was registered as G-AAAB in August 1928. Guinness may have found the interior headroom of the hull too small, as he almost immediately ordered its replacement, the all-metal Supermarine Air Yacht. The Solent was deregistered and scrapped in 1934.

The name 'Supermarine Solent' was also applied to a separate aircraft design, using the Supermarine Southampton hull with the Nanok's larger wings, as a 14-seat civil transport. This design failed to sell though.

Operational history
The Solent was certified as airworthy on 5 September 1928, and was used to fly frequently between England and the owner's home near Lough Corrib in County Galway, Ireland. It remained in use until it was scrapped in 1934.

Operators

Royal Danish Navy

Specifications (Nanok)

See also

References

Bibliography

Further reading

External links

 Photo
 Supermarin – British Aircraft Directory

1920s British patrol aircraft
Flying boats
Nanok
1920s British airliners
Biplanes
Trimotors